Kristy Giteau (born 16 March 1981) is a rugby union player. She is the sister of Wallabies player Matt Giteau.

References

1981 births
Living people
Australian people of French descent
Australia women's international rugby union players
Australian female rugby union players
Sportswomen from New South Wales
Rugby union players from Sydney
Rugby union wings